The 2008 IIHF Inline Hockey World Championship Division I was an international inline hockey tournament run by the International Ice Hockey Federation. The Division I tournament ran alongside the 2008 IIHF Inline Hockey World Championship and took place between 22 and 28 June 2008 in Bratislava, Slovakia. The tournament was won by Canada who upon winning gained promotion to the 2009 IIHF Inline Hockey World Championship. While Bulgaria and New Zealand were relegated to the continental qualifications after losing their relegation round games.

Qualification
Six nations returned to Division I after automatically qualifying based on their results from the 2007 Division I tournament. Bulgaria and Canada qualified for the two remaining spots, replacing Namibia and South Africa who were relegated after losing their 2007 relegation round games.

 – Finished fourth in 2007 World Championship Division I
 – Finished first in 2007 World Championship Division I
 – Qualification spot
 – Qualification spot
 – Finished fifth in 2007 World Championship Division I
 – Finished third in 2007 World Championship Division I
 – Finished sixth in 2007 World Championship Division I
 – Finished second in 2007 World Championship Division I

Seeding and groups
The seeding in the preliminary round was based on the final standings at the 2007 IIHF Inline Hockey World Championship Division I tournament. Division I's groups are named Group C and Group D while the 2008 IIHF Inline Hockey World Championship use Group A and Group B, as both tournaments are held in Bratislava, Slovakia. The teams were grouped accordingly by seeding at the previous year's tournament (in parenthesis is the corresponding seeding):

Group C
 (9)
 (12)
 (13)
 (16)

Group D
 (10)
 (11)
 (14)
 (15)

Preliminary round
Eight participating teams were placed in the following two groups. After playing a round-robin, the top two teams advance to the Qualifying round where they face-off against the two last-placed teams of the Groups A and B from the Top Division tournament for a chance to participate in the Top Division playoffs. Teams finishing second through to fourth advance to the Playoff round.

All times are local (UTC+2).

Group C

Group D

Qualifying round
Great Britain and Canada advanced to the qualifying round after finishing first in Group C and Group D respectively. Great Britain faced off against Austria, who finished last in Group A of the Top Division tournament, and Canada was drawn against Germany, who finished last in Group B of the Top Division tournament, for a chance to participate in the Top Division playoffs. Both Great Britain and Canada lost their matches and advanced to the Division I playoffs, while Austria and Germany advanced to the Top Division playoffs.

All times are local (UTC+2).

Playoff round
Great Britain and Canada advanced to the playoff round after losing their qualifying round matches. They were seeded alongside the six other teams of the tournament based on their results in the preliminary round. The four winning quarterfinalists advanced to the semifinals while the losing teams moved on to the relegation round. In the relegation round New Zealand and Bulgaria lost their games to Hungary and Japan respectively and were relegated to the continental qualifications. In the semifinals Great Britain defeated Brazil and Canada beat Australia, both advancing to the gold medal game. After losing the semifinals Australia and Brazil played off for the bronze medal with Brazil winning 4–3. Canada defeated Great Britain 7–4 in the gold medal game and earned promotion to the 2009 IIHF Inline Hockey World Championship.

Draw

Quarterfinals

Relegation round

Semifinals

Bronze medal game

Gold medal game

Ranking and statistics

Final standings
The final standings of the tournament according to IIHF:

Tournament Awards
Best players selected by the directorate:
Best Goalkeeper:  Derek Shybunka
Best Defenseman:  Luiz Almeida
Best Forward:  John Dolan

Scoring leaders

List shows the top skaters sorted by points, then goals. If the list exceeds 10 skaters because of a tie in points, all of the tied skaters are shown. Games from the qualifying round do not count towards the Division I statistics.

Leading goaltenders
Only the top five goaltenders, based on save percentage, who have played at least 40% of their team's minutes are included in this list. Games from the qualifying round do not count towards the Division I statistics.

References

External links
Division I at IIHF.com

IIHF Inline Hockey World Championship Division I
2008 in inline hockey
IIHF InLine Hockey World Championship
Inline hockey in Slovakia
IIHF Inline Hockey World Championship Division I
June 2008 sports events in Europe
Sports competitions in Bratislava